Cameron Johnston (born 24 February 1992) is an Australian gridiron football punter for the Houston Texans of the National Football League (NFL). He played college football at Ohio State. He formerly played Australian rules football and was a member of the Melbourne Football Club in 2011. He also played for the Philadelphia Eagles of the NFL from 2017 to 2020.

Early life and Australian rules career
Johnston is from Geelong, Victoria, Australia, and attended high school at St Joseph's College. He played for the Geelong Falcons in the under-18 TAC Cup before being drafted to the Melbourne Football Club with the 63rd selection in the 2011 AFL rookie draft. A midfielder, Johnston spent the 2011 season playing for the Casey Scorpions, Melbourne's affiliate team in the Victorian Football League (VFL). However, he managed only six games for Casey's senior team, instead spending most of the season in the VFL reserves (a third-tier competition). Johnston was delisted by Melbourne at the season's end.

College career
After failing at his AFL ambitions, Johnston signed up with Prokick Australia in 2012, an academy headed by Nathan Chapman for Australian players looking to pursue a career in the United States. In 2013, he secured a full scholarship with Ohio State. As a freshman, Johnston led all Big Ten punters with a 44.0 per punt average and ranked 16th-best nationally. He was named a second-team freshman All-American by College Football News later that year. In his final three years at OSU, he was part of the 2014 national championship team, earned second and first-team honors in his junior and senior years respectively, and was named Eddleman-Fields Big Ten Punter of the Year. He also ranked academically in the Big Ten his final two years.

NFL career

Philadelphia Eagles

Johnston signed with the Philadelphia Eagles as an undrafted free agent on 11 May 2017. He was waived on 2 September 2017. He signed a reserve/future contract with the Eagles on 3 January 2018.

On 1 September 2018, Johnston made the Eagles 53-man roster for the 2018 season. He made his NFL debut in the 2018 season opener against the Atlanta Falcons and had six punts for 313 net yards in the 18–12 victory.

On 24 March 2020, Johnston was re-signed to a one-year, $660,000 contract by the Eagles.

Houston Texans
Johnston signed with the Houston Texans on March 30, 2021.

References

External links
Ohio State Buckeyes bio

1992 births
Living people
Australian players of American football
American football punters
Ohio State Buckeyes football players
Philadelphia Eagles players
Sportspeople from Geelong
Geelong Falcons players
Casey Demons players
Australian rules footballers from Geelong
Footballers who switched code
Australian rules football players that played in the NFL
Houston Texans players